The Chairman of the Kirov Oblast Duma is the presiding officer of that legislature.

Chairmen

Sources 
Kirov Oblast Duma

Lists of legislative speakers in Russia
Politics of Kirov Oblast